Might makes right is an aphorism used in negative assessments of expressions of power.

Might makes right may also refer to: 
"Might Makes Right", a song by Camper Van Beethoven from their album New Roman Times
Might Is Right, a book by Ragnar Redbeard